Tyranneutes is a genus of South American birds in the family Pipridae. Both genders somewhat resemble females of other manakins, but are even smaller. They are native to the humid forests in the Amazon and the Guianas. The two species are entirely allopatric (their distributions separated by major rivers).

Etymology
Tyranneutes:  turanneuō “to be a tyrant”, from τυραννος turannos “tyrant”.

Species

References

 Restall, R. L., Rodner, C., & Lentino, M. (2006). Birds of Northern South America. Christopher Helm, London.  (vol. 1).  (vol. 2).

 
Bird genera
Taxa named by Philip Sclater
Taxa named by Osbert Salvin
Taxonomy articles created by Polbot